Willa Sibert Cather (born Wilella Sibert Cather; December 7, 1873 – April 24, 1947) was an American writer known for her novels of life on the Great Plains, including O Pioneers!, The Song of the Lark, and My Ántonia. In 1923, she was awarded the Pulitzer Prize for One of Ours, a novel set during World War I.

Willa Cather and her family moved from Virginia to Webster County, Nebraska, when she was nine years old. The family later settled in the town of Red Cloud.  Shortly after graduating from the University of Nebraska–Lincoln, Cather moved to Pittsburgh for ten years, supporting herself as a magazine editor and high school English teacher. At the age of 33, she moved to New York City, her primary home for the rest of her life, though she also traveled widely and spent considerable time at her summer residence on Grand Manan Island, New Brunswick. She spent the last 39 years of her life with her domestic partner, Edith Lewis, before being diagnosed with breast cancer and dying of a cerebral hemorrhage. She is buried beside Lewis in a Jaffrey, New Hampshire plot.

Cather achieved recognition as a novelist of the frontier and pioneer experience. She wrote of the spirit of those settlers moving into the western states, many of them European immigrants in the nineteenth century. Common themes in her work include nostalgia and exile. A sense of place is an important element in Cather's fiction: physical landscapes and domestic spaces are for Cather dynamic presences against which her characters struggle and find community.

Early life and education

Cather was born in 1873 on her maternal grandmother's farm in the Back Creek Valley near Winchester, Virginia. Her father was Charles Fectigue Cather. The Cather family originated in Wales, the name deriving from Cadair Idris, a Gwynedd mountain. Her mother was Mary Virginia Boak, a former school teacher. By the time Cather turned twelve months old, the family had moved to Willow Shade, a Greek Revival-style home on 130 acres given to them by her paternal grandparents.

Mary Cather had six more children after Willa: Roscoe, Douglass, Jessica, James, John, and Elsie. Cather was closer to her brothers than to her sisters whom, according to biographer Hermione Lee, she "seems not to have liked very much."

At the urging of Charles Cather's parents, the family moved to Nebraska in 1883 when Willa was nine years old. The farmland appealed to Charles' father, and the family wished to escape the tuberculosis outbreaks that were rampant in Virginia. Willa's father tried his hand at farming for eighteen months, then moved the family into the town of Red Cloud, where he opened a real estate and insurance business, and the children attended school for the first time. Some of Cather's earliest work was first published in the Red Cloud Chief, the city's local paper, and Cather read widely, having made friends with a Jewish couple, the Wieners, who offered her free access to their extensive library in Red Cloud. At the same time, she made house calls with the local physician and decided to become a surgeon. For a short while, she signed her name as William, but this was quickly abandoned for Willa instead.

In 1890, at the age of sixteen, Cather graduated from Red Cloud High School. She moved to Lincoln, Nebraska to enroll at the University of Nebraska–Lincoln. In her first year, her essay on Thomas Carlyle was published in the Nebraska State Journal without her knowledge. After this, she published columns for $1 apiece, saying that seeing her words printed on the page had "a kind of hypnotic effect", pushing her to continue writing. After this experience, she became a regular contributor to the Journal. In addition to her work with the local paper, Cather served as the main editor of The Hesperian, the university's student newspaper, and became a writer for the Lincoln Courier. While at the university, she learned mathematics from and was befriended by John J. Pershing, who later became General of the Armies and, like Cather, earned a Pulitzer Prize for his writing. She changed her plans from studying science to become a physician, instead graduating with a Bachelor of Arts in English in 1895.

Cather's time in Nebraska, still considered a frontier state, was a formative experience for her: She was moved by the dramatic environment and weather, the vastness of the prairie, and the various cultures of the immigrant and Native American families in the area.

Life and career
In 1896, Cather was hired to write for a women's magazine, Home Monthly, and moved to Pittsburgh. There, she wrote journalistic pieces, short stories, and poetry. A year later, after the magazine was sold, she became a telegraph editor and critic for the Pittsburgh Leader and frequently contributed poetry and short fiction to The Library, another local publication. In Pittsburgh, she taught Latin, algebra, and English composition at Central High School for one year; she then taught English and Latin at Allegheny High School, where she came to head the English department.

Shortly after moving to Pittsburgh, Cather wrote short stories, including publishing "Tommy, the Unsentimental" in the Home Monthly, about a Nebraskan girl with a masculine name who looks like a boy and saves her father's bank business. Janis P. Stout calls this story one of several Cather works that "demonstrate the speciousness of rigid gender roles and give favorable treatment to characters who undermine conventions." Her first book, a collection of poetry called April Twilights, was published in 1903. Shortly after this, in 1905, Cather's first collection of short stories, The Troll Garden, was published. It contained some of her most famous stories, including "A Wagner Matinee", "The Sculptor's Funeral", and "Paul's Case".

After Cather was offered an editorial position at McClure's Magazine in 1906, she moved to New York City. During her first year at McClure's, the newspaper published a critical series of articles of the religious leader Mary Baker Eddy, crediting freelance journalist Georgine Milmine as the author. Cather contributed to the series, but there has been some debate as to how much. Milmine had performed copious amounts of research, but she did not have the resources to produce a manuscript independently, and McClure's employed Cather and a few other editors including Burton J. Hendrick to assist her. This biography was serialized in McClure's over the next eighteen months and then published in book form. McClure's also serialized Cather's first novel, Alexander's Bridge (1912). While most reviews were favorable, such as The Atlantic calling the writing "deft and skillful", Cather herself soon saw the novel as weak and shallow.

Cather followed Alexander's Bridge with her three novels set in the Great Plains, which eventually became both popular and critical successes: O Pioneers! (1913), The Song of the Lark (1915), and My Ántonia (1918), which are—taken together—sometimes referred to as her "Prairie Trilogy". It is this succession of plains-based novels for which Cather was celebrated for her use of plainspoken language about ordinary people. Sinclair Lewis, for example, praised her work for making Nebraska available to the wider world for the first time. After writing The Great Gatsby, F. Scott Fitzgerald lamented that it was a failure in comparison to My Ántonia.

1920s 
As late as 1920, Cather became dissatisfied with the performance of her publisher, Houghton Mifflin, which devoted an advertising budget of only $300 to My Ántonia, and refused to pay for all the illustrations she commissioned for the book from Władysław T. Benda. What's more, the physical quality of the books was poor. That year, she turned to the young publishing house, Alfred A. Knopf, which had a reputation for supporting its authors through advertising campaigns. She also liked the look of its books and had been impressed with its edition of Green Mansions by William Henry Hudson. She so enjoyed their style that all her Knopf books of the 1920s—save for one printing of her short story collection Youth and the Bright Medusa—matched in design on their second and subsequent printings.

By this time, Cather was firmly established as a major American writer, receiving the Pulitzer Prize in 1923 for her World War I-based novel, One of Ours. She followed this up with the popular Death Comes for the Archbishop in 1927, selling 86,500 copies in just two years, and which has been included on the Modern Library 100 Best Novels of the twentieth century. Two of her three other novels of the decade—A Lost Lady and The Professor's House—elevated her literary status dramatically. She was invited to give several hundred lectures to the public, earned significant royalties, and sold the movie rights to A Lost Lady. Her other novel of the decade, the 1926 My Mortal Enemy, received no widespread acclaim—and in fact, neither she nor her partner, Edith Lewis, made significant mention of it later in their lives.

Despite her success, she was the subject of much criticism, particularly surrounding One of Ours. Her close friend, Elizabeth Shepley Sergeant, saw the novel as a betrayal of the realities of war, not understanding how to "bridge the gap between [Cather's] idealized war vision ... and my own stark impressions of war as lived." Similarly, Ernest Hemingway took issue with her portrayal of war, writing in a 1923 letter: "Wasn’t [the novel’s] last scene in the lines wonderful? Do you know where it came from? The battle scene in Birth of a Nation. I identified episode after episode, Catherized. Poor woman, she had to get her war experience somewhere."

1930s 

By the 1930s, an increasingly large share of critics began to dismiss her as overly romantic and nostalgic, unable to grapple with contemporary issues: Granville Hicks, for instance, charged Cather with escaping into an idealized past to avoid confronting them. And it was particularly in the context of the hardships of the Great Depression in which her work was seen as lacking social relevance. Similarly, critics—and Cather herself—were disappointed when her novel A Lost Lady was made into a film; the film had little resemblance to the novel.

Cather's lifelong conservative politics, appealing to critics such as Mencken, Randolph Bourne, and Carl Van Doren, soured her reputation with younger, often left-leaning critics like Hicks and Edmund Wilson. Despite this critical opposition to her work, Cather remained a popular writer whose novels and short story collections continued to sell well; in 1931 Shadows on the Rock was the most widely read novel in the United States, and Lucy Gayheart became a bestseller in 1935.

While Cather made her last trip to Red Cloud in 1931 for a family gathering after her mother's death, she stayed in touch with her Red Cloud friends and sent money to Annie Pavelka and other families during the Depression years. In 1932, Cather published Obscure Destinies, her final collection of short fiction, which contained "Neighbour Rosicky", one of her most highly regarded stories. That same summer, she moved into a new apartment on Park Avenue with Edith Lewis, and during a visit on Grand Manan, she probably began working on her next novel, Lucy Gayheart.

Cather suffered two devastating losses in 1938. In June, her favorite brother, Douglass, died of a heart attack. Cather was too grief-stricken to attend the funeral. Four months later, Isabelle McClung died. Cather and McClung had lived together when Cather first arrived in Pittsburgh, and while McClung eventually married and moved with her husband to Toronto, the two women remained devoted friends. Cather wrote that Isabelle was the person for whom she wrote all her books.

Final years 

During the summer of 1940, Cather and Lewis went to Grand Manan for the last time, and Cather finished her final novel, Sapphira and the Slave Girl, a book much darker in tone and subject matter than her previous works. While Sapphira is understood by readers as lacking a moral sense and failing to evoke empathy, the novel was a great critical and commercial success, with an advance printing of 25,000 copies. It was then adopted by the Book of the Month Club, which bought more than 200,000 copies. Her final story, "The Best Years", intended as a gift for her brother, was retrospective. It contained images or "keepsakes" from each of her twelve published novels and the short stories in Obscure Destinies.

Although an inflamed tendon in her hand hampered her writing, Cather managed to finish a substantial part of a novel set in Avignon, France. She had titled it Hard Punishments and placed it in the 14th century during the reign of Antipope Benedict XIV. She was elected a fellow of the American Academy of Arts and Sciences in 1943. The same year, she executed a will that prohibited the publication of her letters and dramatization of her works. In 1944, she received the gold medal for fiction from the National Institute of Arts and Letters, a prestigious award given for an author's total accomplishments.

Cather was diagnosed with breast cancer in December 1945 and underwent a mastectomy on January 14, 1946. Probably by early 1947, her cancer metastasized to her liver, becoming stage IV cancer. About a year later, on April 24, 1947, Cather died of a cerebral hemorrhage, at the age of 73, in her home at 570 Park Avenue in Manhattan. After Cather's death, Edith Lewis destroyed the manuscript of Hard Punishments, according to Cather's instructions. She is buried at the southwest corner of the Old Burying Ground in Jaffrey, New Hampshire, alongside Edith Lewis—a place she first visited when joining Isabelle McClung and her husband, violinist Jan Hambourg, at the Shattuck Inn, where she routinely visited later in life owing to its seclusion.

Bibliography 

Novels

 Alexander's Bridge (1912)
 O Pioneers! (1913)
 The Song of the Lark (1915)
 My Ántonia (1918)
 One of Ours (1922)
 A Lost Lady (1923)
 The Professor's House (1925)
 My Mortal Enemy (1926)
 Death Comes for the Archbishop (1927)
 Shadows on the Rock (1931)
 Lucy Gayheart (1935)
 Sapphira and the Slave Girl (1940)

Short fiction

 The Troll Garden (1905)
 Youth and the Bright Medusa (1920)
 Obscure Destinies (1932)
 Neighbour Rosicky (1932)
 The Old Beauty and Others (1948)
 Willa Cather's Collected Short Fiction, 1892–1912 (1965)
 Uncle Valentine and Other Stories: Willa Cather's Uncollected Short Fiction, 1915–1929 (1972)

Poetry

 April Twilights (1903)
 April Twilights and Other Poems (1923)

Personal life

Scholars disagree about Cather's sexual identity. Some believe it impossible or anachronistic to determine whether she had same-sex attraction, while others disagree. Researcher Deborah Carlin suggests that denial of Cather being a lesbian is rooted in treating same-sex desire "as an insult to Cather and her reputation", rather than a neutral historical perspective. Melissa Homestead has argued that Cather was attracted to Edith Lewis, and in so doing, asked: "What kind of evidence is needed to establish this as a lesbian relationship? Photographs of the two of them in bed together? She was an integral part of Cather’s life, creatively and personally." Beyond her own relationships with women, Cather's reliance on male characters has been used to support the idea of her same-sex attraction. Harold Bloom calls her "erotically evasive in her art" due to prevailing "societal taboos."

In any event, throughout Cather's adult life, her closest relationships were with women. These included her college friend Louise Pound; the Pittsburgh socialite Isabelle McClung, with whom Cather traveled to Europe and at whose Toronto home she stayed for prolonged visits; the opera singer Olive Fremstad; and most notably, the editor Edith Lewis, with whom Cather lived the last 39 years of her life.

Cather's relationship with Lewis began in the early 1900s. They lived together in a series of apartments in New York City from 1908 until Cather's death in 1947. From 1913 to 1927, Cather and Lewis lived at No. 5 Bank Street in Greenwich Village. They moved when the apartment was scheduled for demolition during the construction of the Broadway–Seventh Avenue New York City Subway line (now the ). While Lewis was selected as the literary trustee for Cather's estate, she was not merely a secretary for Cather's documents but an integral part of Cather's creative process.

Beginning in 1922, Cather spent summers on the island of Grand Manan in New Brunswick, where she bought a cottage in Whale Cove on the Bay of Fundy. This is where her short story, "Before Breakfast", is set. She valued the seclusion of the island and did not mind that her cottage had neither indoor plumbing nor electricity. Anyone wishing to reach her could do so by telegraph or mail. In 1940, she stopped visiting Grand Manan after Canada's entrance to World War II, as travel was considerably more difficult; she also began a long recuperation from gallbladder surgery in 1942 that restricted travel.

A resolutely private person, Cather destroyed many drafts, personal papers, and letters, asking others to do the same. While many complied, some did not. Her will restricted the ability of scholars to quote from the personal papers that remain. But in April 2013, The Selected Letters of Willa Cather—a collection of 566 letters Cather wrote to friends, family, and literary acquaintances such as Thornton Wilder and F. Scott Fitzgerald—was published, two years after the death of Cather's nephew and second literary executor, Charles Cather. Willa Cather's correspondence revealed the complexity of her character and inner world. The letters do not disclose any intimate details about Cather's personal life, but they do "make clear that [her] primary emotional attachments were to women." The Willa Cather Archive at the University of Nebraska–Lincoln works to digitize her complete body of writing, including private correspondence and published work. As of 2021, about 2,100 letters have been made freely available to the public, in addition to transcription of her own published writing.

Writing influences
Cather admired Henry James's use of language and characterization. While Cather enjoyed the novels of several women—including George Eliot, the Brontës, and Jane Austen—she regarded most women writers with disdain, judging them overly sentimental. One contemporary exception was Sarah Orne Jewett, who became Cather's friend and mentor. Jewett advised Cather of several things: to use female narrators in her fiction (even though Cather preferred using male perspectives), to write about her "own country" (O Pioneers! was dedicated in large part to Jewett), and to write fiction that explicitly represented romantic attraction between women. Cather was also influenced by the work of Katherine Mansfield, praising in an essay Mansfield's ability "to throw a luminous streak out onto the shadowy realm of personal relationships."

Cather's high regard for the immigrant families forging lives and enduring hardships on the Nebraska plains shaped much of her fiction. The Burlington Depot in Red Cloud brought in many strange and wonderful people to her small town. As a child, she visited immigrant families in her area and returned home in "the most unreasonable state of excitement," feeling that she "had got inside another person's skin." After a trip to Red Cloud in 1916, Cather decided to write a novel based on the events in the life of her childhood friend Annie Sadilek Pavelka, a Bohemian girl who became the model for the title character in My Ántonia. Cather was likewise fascinated by the French-Canadian pioneers from Quebec who had settled in the Red Cloud area while she was a girl.

During a brief stopover in Quebec with Edith Lewis in 1927, Cather was inspired to write a novel set in that French-Canadian city. Lewis recalled: "From the first moment that she looked down from the windows of the [Chateau] Frontenac [Hotel] on the pointed roofs and Norman outlines of the town of Quebec, Willa Cather was not merely stirred and charmed—she was overwhelmed by the flood of memories, recognition, surmise it called up; by the sense of its extraordinary French character, isolated and kept intact through hundreds of years, as if by a miracle, on this great un-French continent." Cather finished her novel Shadows on the Rock, a historical novel set in 17th-century Quebec, in 1931; it was later included in Life magazine's list of the 100 outstanding books of 1924–1944. The French influence is found in many other Cather works, including Death Comes for the Archbishop (1927) and her final, unfinished novel set in Avignon, Hard Punishments.

Literary style and reception

Although Cather began her writing career as a journalist, she made a distinction between journalism, which she saw as being primarily informative, and literature, which she saw as an art form. Cather's work is often marked by—and criticized for—its nostalgic tone and themes drawn from memories of her early years on the American plains. Consequently, a sense of place is integral to her work: notions of land, the frontier, pioneering and relationships with western landscapes are recurrent. Even when her heroines were placed in an urban environment, the influence of place was critical, and the way that power was displayed through room layout and furniture is evident in her novels like My Mortal Enemy. Though she hardly confined herself to writing exclusively about the Midwest, Cather is virtually inseparable from the Midwestern identity that she actively cultivated (even though she was not a “native” Midwesterner). While Cather is said to have significantly altered her literary approach in each of her novels, this stance is not universal; some critics have charged Cather with being out of touch with her times and failing to use more experimental techniques in her writing, such as stream of consciousness. At the same time, others have sought to place Cather alongside modernists by either pointing to the extreme effects of her apparently simple Romanticism or acknowledging her own "middle ground":

She had formed and matured her ideas on art before she wrote a novel. She had no more reason to follow Gertrude Stein and James Joyce, whose work she respected, than they did to follow her. Her style solves the problems in which she was interested. She wanted to stand midway between the journalists whose omniscient objectivity accumulate more fact than any character could notice and the psychological novelist whose use of subjective point of view stories distorts objective reality. She developed her theory on a middle ground, selecting facts from experience on the basis of feeling and then presenting the experience in a lucid, objective style.

The English novelist A. S. Byatt has written that with each work Cather reinvented the novel form to investigate the changes in the human condition over time. Particularly in her frontier novels, Cather wrote of both the beauty and terror of life. Like the exiled characters of Henry James, an author who had a significant influence on the author, most of Cather's major characters live as exiled immigrants, identifying with the immigrants' "sense of homelessness and exile" following her own feelings of exile living on the frontier. It is through their engagement with their environment that they gain their community. Susan J. Rosowski wrote that Cather was perhaps the first to grant immigrants a respectable position in American literature.

Notes

Footnotes

References

External links

Libraries
 Willa Cather Review at the Willa Cather Foundation
 Special Collections & Archives at The National Willa Cather Center
 Willa Cather Archive at University of Nebraska-Lincoln
  at the Nebraska State Historical Society
 Willa Cather Collection at Drew University
 Willa Cather–Irene Miner Weisz Papers  at the Newberry Library
 Benjamin D. Hitz–Willa Cather Papers  at the Newberry Library
 Ann Safford Mandel collection of Willa Cather papers at the Mortimer Rare Book Collection

Online editions
 
 
 
 
 
 Willa Cather at Poets' Corner

 
1873 births
1947 deaths
20th-century American biographers
20th-century American Episcopalians
20th-century American novelists
20th-century American poets
20th-century American short story writers
20th-century American women writers
American magazine writers
American people of Welsh descent
American women biographers
American women novelists
American women poets
American women short story writers
Cowgirl Hall of Fame inductees
Critics of Christian Science
Fellows of the American Academy of Arts and Sciences
American lesbian writers
Novelists from New York (state)
Novelists from Pennsylvania
Novelists from Virginia
People from Grand Manan
People from Greenwich Village
People from Red Cloud, Nebraska
People from the Upper East Side
People from Winchester, Virginia
Poets from Nebraska
Poets from New York (state)
Poets from Pennsylvania
Poets from Virginia
Pulitzer Prize for the Novel winners
University of Nebraska–Lincoln alumni
Writers from Nebraska
Writers from Manhattan
Writers from Pittsburgh
LGBT people from Virginia
Members of the American Academy of Arts and Letters